Samuel A. Santoro is an American microbiologist and immunologist, focusing in structure and biology of integrin adhesive receptors for extracellular matrix proteins, currently the Dorothy B. and Theodore R. Austin Professor and Chair at Vanderbilt University.

References

Year of birth missing (living people)
Living people
Vanderbilt University faculty
American microbiologists
Vanderbilt University alumni